The following events occurred in October 1965:

October 1, 1965 (Friday)

Members of the 30 September Movement assassinated six Indonesian Army generals in an abortive coup d'état. Other victims included the 5-year-old daughter of General Abdul Harris Nasution, shot by mistake. The movement also kidnapped First Lieutenant Pierre Tendean, mistaking him for General Nasution. At 7:00 a.m., Radio Republik Indonesia broadcast a message from Lieutenant-Colonel Untung Syamsuri, commander of Cakrabirawa, the Presidential guard, stating that the 30 September Movement, an internal army organization, had taken control of strategic locations in Jakarta, with the help of other military units, in order to forestall a coup attempt by a 'General's Council' aided by the Central Intelligence Agency, intent on removing President Sukarno on 5 October, "Army Day". Sukarno took up residence in the Bogor Palace, while Omar Dhani and D.N. Aidit, implicated in the coup, fled the country. Led by Suharto, commander of the Army's Strategic Reserve, the army regained control of all the installations previously held by forces of the 30 September Movement.
Gemini Agena target vehicle 5002 was transported to complex 14 and mated to target launch vehicle 5301. Preliminary checks were followed, on October 4, by the Joint Flight Acceptance Composite Test (J-FACT). J-FACT was a combined check of all contractors, the range, the vehicles, and aerospace ground equipment in a simulated countdown and flight; propellants and high pressure gases were not loaded, nor was the gantry removed. Simultaneous Launch Demonstration was successfully completed October 7.
The first telephone conversation between two undersea habitats took place when the aquanauts of the American SEALAB II spoke for 16 minutes with the French oceanauts living in the bathyscaph commanded by Jacques Cousteau. Oceanographer Rick Gregg, who could speak French, did most of the talking for the Americans, while French team leader André Laban spoke English. According to the UPI account, "The aquanauts and oceanauts had some difficulty understanding one another because the concentration of helium in the atmosphere they breathe made their voices sound like Donald Duck, according to one observer."
Died:
Major General M. T. Haryono, 41, Third Deputy Indonesian Army Commander, shot
Gareth Hughes, 71, Welsh stage and silent film actor, complications of byssinosis
Brigadier General D. I. Pandjaitan, 40, Indonesian Army, shot
Major General Siswondo Parman, 47, Indonesian Army, shot
Major General R. Soeprapto, 45, Second Deputy Indonesian Army Commander, shot
Brigadier General Sutoyo Siswomiharjo, 43, Chief Military Prosecutor, shot
Lieutenant General Ahmad Yani, 43, Minister of the Army of Indonesia, shot

October 2, 1965 (Saturday)
The Indonesian Army regained control of Halim Air Force Base after a short battle, effectively ending the 30 September Movement within two days.
Monsignor Harold Robert Perry became the first African-American Roman Catholic bishop of the 20th Century, as Pope Paul VI named him one of the two auxiliary bishops of the Archdiocese of New Orleans. From 1875 to 1900, the Bishop of Portland, Maine, had been James Augustine Healy, a mixed-race priest who was a Negro under the laws of his home state of Georgia.
Soviet Communist Party First Secretary Leonid Brezhnev, the de facto leader of the Soviet Union, was given an official Soviet government position when he was returned to the 16 member Presidium of the Supreme Soviet.  Brezhnev had been the President of the Presidium, the Soviet Union's head of state, from 1960 to 1964 before replacing Nikita Khrushchev as Party First Secretary.  The Presidium also fired Pyotr Lomako from his jobs as Chairman of the State Planning Committee and Deputy Premier, in an apparent move to shift to more productive industrial management.
The Los Angeles Dodgers won the National League pennant as pitcher Sandy Koufax hurled his 26th win of the season in a 3 to 1 defeat of the Milwaukee Braves on the second to the last day of the season.  Going into the 161st game of the 162 game NL season, the Dodgers had a 95-65 and the San Francisco Giants were two games behind at 93-67.  While the Giants beat the Cincinnati Reds, 3-2, the Dodgers win left the Giants two games out of first place with only one game left to play.
Died: 
Nicky Arnstein, 86, American gambler and confidence trickster, second husband of Fanny Brice
Oskar R. Lange, 61, Polish economist and diplomat

October 3, 1965 (Sunday)
U.S. President Lyndon B. Johnson signed the Immigration and Nationality Act of 1965 which ended quotas based on national origin.  Johnson chose to hold the signing on Liberty Island in New York Harbor, next to the Statue of Liberty.  As one historian would observe fifty years later, "the law changed the face of America.  The major source countries of immigration radically shifted from Europe to Latin America and Asia.  The number of immigrants tripled by 1978.  It made the country the highly diverse, multinational, multiethnic, multicultural American nation of immigrants that it is today."  Johnson said in a speech, "from this day forth those wishing  to immigrate to America shall be admitted on the basis of their skills and their close relationship to those already here.  This is a simple test, and it is a fair test. Those who can contribute most to this country--to its growth, to its strength, to its spirit--will be the first that are admitted to this land.  The fairness of this standard is so self-evident that we may well wonder that it has not always been applied. Yet the fact is that for over four decades the immigration policy of the United States has been twisted and has been distorted by the harsh injustice of the national origins quota system.... Today, with my signature, this system is abolished.  We can now believe that it will never again shadow the gate to the American Nation with the twin barriers of prejudice and privilege."
Fidel Castro announced that Che Guevara had resigned his government position on April 1 and had left Cuba to fight for the revolutionary cause abroad. 
Born: Jan-Ove Waldner, Swedish table tennis player and world single champion in 1989, 1997, and 2000; in Stockholm
Died: Zachary Scott, 51, American film and stage actor, of a brain tumor.

October 4, 1965 (Monday)
Pope Paul VI made the first visit ever by the Roman Catholic Pontiff to the United States, appearing for a Mass before 90,000 people at New York's Yankee Stadium and making a speech at the United Nations, as well as meeting with U.S. President Johnson.
Eighty-seven people were killed and ten seriously injured when the last three coaches of a South African Railways commuter train derailed near Durban, South Africa.  Most of the victims were black; one white railway employee who ran to the scene was beaten to death by angry survivors.  
The United States began bombing Cambodia, despite that nation's neutrality in the Vietnam War, to attack Viet Cong guerrillas who crossed the border from South Vietnam.  Records released in 2000 would show that between October 4, 1965 and August 15, 1973, there would be 2,756,941 tons of bombs dropped in 230,516 separate missions.
The new University of Warwick held its first classes, with 430 students on a campus in Canterbury. Warwick was one of seven new "plate glass universities" created as part of the British campaign to expand the availability of university education to students in the United Kingdom.  Fifty years later, Warwick would have almost 27,000 students.   
The new University of California, Santa Cruz held its first classes, with 665 students, of whom 525 were freshmen in the buildings of Cowell College, the first of ten "residential colleges" that would be the feature of UCSC.  Fifty years later, UC Santa Cruz would have almost 18,000 students.  
Born: Micky Ward (George Michael Ward Jr.), light heavyweight boxing champion, portrayed by Mark Wahlberg in the 2010 film The Fighter; in Lowell, Massachusetts

October 5, 1965 (Tuesday)
The American satellite "Orbital Vehicle 1" was launched westward into orbit from Vandenberg Air Force Base in California, becoming the first human-made object in space to orbit the Earth from east to west, counter to the rotation of the planet. Since the launch of Sputnik in 1957, all Soviet and American satellites had been sent on a west-east trajectory or, in the case of those sent from Vandenberg into polar orbit, fired southward.
Born: 
Mario Lemieux, Canadian ice hockey star and Hockey Hall of Fame inductee who played for, and later became the owner of the NHL Pittsburgh Penguins; in Montreal
Patrick Roy, Canadian ice hockey star and Hockey Hall of Fame inductee who played goaltender for the NHL Montreal Canadiens and the Colorado Avalanche; in Quebec City

October 6, 1965 (Wednesday)
Ian Brady and Myra Hindley murdered their fifth and last young victim, luring Edward Evans, a 17-year-old apprentice electrician. After Hindley drove Brady to the Manchester Central Railway station, they selected Evans as a victim and lured him to a house at 16 Wardle Brook Avenue on the Hattersley housing estate in Cheshire. Brady took a hatchet and hacked him to death. Hindley's brother-in-law, who witnessed the murder, called the Cheshire Constabulary early the next day, and Brady was arrested. Hindley would be arrested five days later.  
Coventry won the match, 2-1. Over 10,000 people paid to watch at Coventry, "only a couple of thousand less than the actual gate".
The United Kingdom and the Netherlands reached a boundary agreement delineating the undersea border between the two nations' control of the continental shelf of the North Sea.
The final design review for the Gemini Atlas-Agena target vehicle ascent guidance equations was held. The equations, using target launch vehicle pitch and yaw steering and Gemini Agena target vehicle nodal steering, were found to have been adequately tested and well within required accuracy limits. The equations were approved as ready for flight.
The Chicago suburb of Bolingbrook, Illinois, was incorporated with roughly 7,000 residents. As of 2010, its population would be 73,366.
Born: Steve Scalise, current House Minority Whip and U.S. Representative of Louisiana's 1st district; in New Orleans

October 7, 1965 (Thursday)
Super typhoon Carmen sank seven Japanese fishing boats off Guam, and 209 people were killed.
The Soviet Lunik 7 lunar probe landed on the Moon on target, but with such force that it was destroyed. The Soviet space agency had no comment, but the director of Britain's Jodrell Bank Observatory, Sir Bernard Lovell, said that all radio signals from the moon ceased at 2208 UTC, and that he speculated that the craft's retrorockets failed to fire completely. The TASS news agency said the next day that the craft "reached the surface of the Moon at 1:08.24 [Moscow time October 8] in the area of the Ocean of Storms west of Kepler crater... some operations, however, were not carried out in accordance with the program and need additional development." Lovell responded that the probe should not be regarded as a failure and commented that, "The Russians have obtained extremely valuable data from this. For the first time they have been able to slow down a capsule prior to landing on the Moon."
Retired U.S. Army Lieutenant General Leslie R. Groves, who had overseen the Manhattan Project, revealed to reporters that President Franklin Roosevelt had discussed the possibility of dropping the first atomic bomb on Germany. The occasion was a White House meeting in December 1944, after the December 15 German counterattack against the Allies. "The President said he was concerned that the Battle of the Bulge might upset the war in Europe," Groves said, "and remarked that maybe this would force us to use the bomb against Germany.... I told him that it would be very difficult to change our plans and gave my reasons," which included that the bomb would not be ready until August 1945; that if the bomb's atomic reaction failed, the Germans would be able to figure out the components and structure from the debris; that German buildings were more solidly constructed than those in Japan; and that there were no B-29 bombers in the European theater of operations. Groves said that he spoke out because of "irresponsible criticism that the United States hesitated to drop the bomb on an enemy which happened to be white-skinned."
The Wet Mock Simulated Launch (WMSL) of Gemini-Titan (GT) 6 and the Simultaneous Launch Demonstration with GT-6 and the Gemini Atlas-Agena target vehicle were conducted. Following WMSL, the Gemini spacecraft and Gemini launch vehicle were demated to allow the spacecraft battery to be replaced. They were remated October 8-13. Spacecraft Systems Test was completed October 15. Prelaunch testing concluded October 20 with the Simulated Flight Test.
Died: Jesse Douglas, 68, American mathematician

October 8, 1965 (Friday)
Following the failed 30 September Movement coup attempt, the Indonesian Army instigated the arrest and execution of communists which would last until March.
The 20th Helicopter Squadron became the first U.S. Air Force cargo helicopter unit to deploy to South Vietnam, operating CH-3C helicopters. It supported Air Force Special Operations "Pony Express" covert operations, primarily in Laos.
The U.S. Army's 173rd Airborne Brigade Combat Team launched the first major American attack on the "Iron Triangle" in South Vietnam, a concentration of Viet Cong guerrillas in an area only  from Saigon.
The International Olympic Committee admitted East Germany and West Germany as separate members, ending the prior practice after World War II of having the athletes of the two opposing nations compete together as one Germany team. 
Prime Minister Ian Smith of Rhodesia, British Prime Minister Harold Wilson, and Arthur Bottomley of the Commonwealth of Nations broke off negotiations in London on a course of action for Britain's last major colony in Africa to become independent, with major disagreement about the issue of majority rule. Smith's position, as described by Chicago reporter Arthur Veysey, was that "the 225,000 white Rhodesians say one-man, one-vote would doom them. They say such an election would be decided on racial lines and the four million Africans would swamp the whites who have been running things, in Britain's name, for 42 years."
U.S. President Johnson entered the Bethesda Naval Hospital in Bethesda, Maryland and was expected to remain hospitalized for two weeks for gall bladder surgery. During his 14-day stay in Bethesda, the President conducted White House official business and press conferences from his hospital bed.
The U.S. House of Representatives voted 245-138 to pass the Highway Beautification Act, legislation requested by Lady Bird Johnson, the President's wife, and largely written under her direction. The Senate had passed the bill on September 16. President Johnson would sign the bill, which restricted outdoor advertising, particularly billboards, on October 22.
Apollo Applications Program (AAP) Director William B. Taylor named Joseph G. Lundholm to fill the newly created position of Manager, Apollo Applications Experiments. In his new job, Lundholm represented Taylor in all cases involving definition, development, test, and operation of experiments for AAP missions.

October 9, 1965 (Saturday)
At a nursing home in Seriate, Italy, eight elderly women died and another seven were seriously injured after all 15 had been given seemingly routine injections of a "heart tonic" as part of their regular treatment. The deaths all happened within two hours after they were given the shots.
The first peripheral nerve stimulation (PNS) surgery to relieve chronic pain was performed on a person. Dr. Patrick D. Wall and Dr. William H. Sweet implanted a pair of silastic split-ring platinum electrodes around the ulnar and medium nerves in a patient identified as a 26-year-old woman with clinical presentation consistent with a complex regional pain syndrome."
Construction began for the yet-unnamed city that would become the new capital of the British Honduras, with the dedication of a Maya Indian pillar by Anthony Greenwood, the British Colonial Secretary. Built at the site of the colonial logging center of Roaring Creek, the new city, completed in 1970, is now named Belmopan.
McDonnell delivered Gemini spacecraft No. 7 to Cape Kennedy. Industrial area activities, including pyrotechnics buildup, fuel cell installation, and modification of the water management system, were completed October 29. The spacecraft was moved to complex 19 and hoisted atop the launch vehicle. The Prespacecraft Mate Verification Test, including activation and deactivation of the fuel cell, was conducted November 1-5.
Citizens in Cibolo, Texas, voted to become an independent city.
Born: Dionicio Cerón, Mexican marathon runner and winner of the London Marathon in 1994, 1995, and 1996; in Toluca

October 10, 1965 (Sunday)
General Suharto was appointed by Indonesia's President Sukarno to form the Indonesian Army's new secret police force, "Operational Command for the Restoration of Security and Order", KOPKAMTIB, an acronym for Komando Operasi Pemulihan Keamanan dan Ketertiban. With the power to suppress political opposition, Suharto would use his position to gradually dismantle Sukarno's regime and to install the "New Order" that he would use as President.
In elections for the 450-member Meclis, the Parliament of Turkey, the Justice Party (Adalet Partisi) led by Süleyman Demirel gained majority control, winning 82 additional seats for 240 overall.
Voters in East Germany were allowed for the first time to choose among multiple candidates, as a new system was implemented where "for the first time, more candidates than posts are listed", although few wished to exercise that option. People voting had the choice of folding a printed list of local candidates and depositing it into a ballot box, or asking to step into a voting booth for the opportunity to strike out the names of any candidates whom they did not like. The official National Front nominees were listed at the top of the ballot, and the names of non-Front alternates followed (more than 45,000 all across the country), and an alternate could only be elected if more than 50 percent of the voters struck out the name of a National Front member. All 204,407 of the Front nominees were elected, and few voters chose to be seen using a booth.
The first group of Cuban refugees to depart the country since Fidel Castro had announced the right to leave departed from the port of Camarioca to travel to the U.S. The 16 people arrived at Key West the next day on the cabin cruiser MMM, a boat piloted by a crew of four Florida-based Cuban exiles.
After the 24-day New York City newspaper strike was settled the night before, the New York Daily News and the New York Journal-American (as well as the neighboring Long Island Press) published their first editions since September 16, while the New York Times and the New York World-Telegram resumed the next day. During the first days of October, the New York Herald-Tribune, which had resigned from the Publishers Association in late September, had been the only daily newspaper published in the city.
Drat! The Cat!, one of the least successful Broadway musicals of the decade, opened at the Martin Beck Theatre.  With music by Milton Schafer and lyrics by Ira Levin, the production featured stars Lesley Ann Warren, Elliott Gould, Charles Durning, Jane Connell, and Beth Howland, but closed after only eight performances.

Ronald Hillery, a 15-year-old, was killed in a climbing accident in Lodge Canyon at Zion National Park in the U.S. state of Utah.
Born: Chris Penn, American actor, in Los Angeles, California (died 2006)
Died:
Herbert Kennedy Andrews, 61, English composer and organist, died while performing at the dedication of a new organ at Trinity College, Oxford.
Katsuo Okazaki, 68, former Japanese Foreign Minister and the Japanese Consul-General in Nanjing during the Nanking Massacre in 1937
George Tucker, 37, American jazz musician, one day after suffering a fatal cerebral hemorrhage while performing in a concert.

October 11, 1965 (Monday)
King Olav V appointed Per Borten, a farmer in Sør-Trøndelag County in central Norway and leader of the Farmer's Party that finished in fourth place in parliamentary elections, as the new Prime Minister of Norway. Borten, "the man nobody expected to get the job", conceded that he was selected as the new premier because members of the two largest parties of the anti-Socialist coalition, the Conservatives and the Liberals, did not trust each other and had considered him to be neutral. Borten would serve until March 4, 1971.
The University of Kent at Canterbury, the second of two new British universities, held its first classes with 560 students arriving at its campus in Canterbury. A reporter would note that "the unwieldy title marks the pride of its contributing city and county"; within 50 years, UKC would have nearly 20,000 students. 
The Indianapolis Times, unable to compete against its rivals, the Star and the News, published its last issue.
The U.S. Air Force renamed the Military Air Transport Service (MATS) to its current name of the Military Airlift Command (MAC).
In a paper presented at the American Institute of Aeronautics and Astronautics' fourth human spaceflight meeting in St. Louis, AAP Director William B. Taylor described the focus and importance of the AAP. In contrast to the Apollo program, with its clear objective of landing on the Moon, AAP's objectives were much less obvious. Under AAP, Taylor said, NASA planned to exploit the capabilities being developed for Apollo as a technological bridge to more extensive human spaceflight missions of the 1970s and 1980s. AAP was not an end in itself, but rather a beginning to build flight experience, technology, and scientific data. Through these space activities, stated Taylor, AAP would lay the foundation for later, major ventures in space and thus would contribute significantly to the national goal of preeminence in space.
Born:
Juan Ignacio Cirac Sasturain, Spanish quantum physicist; in Manresa, Catalonia
Ronit Roy, award-winning Indian film and television actor known for the TV soap opera Kyunki Saas Bhi Kabhi Bahu Thi and the film Udaan; in Nagpur, Maharashtra state
Died:
Frank M. Dixon, 73, reformist Governor of Alabama, 1939-1943
Dorothea Lange, 70, American photojournalist most famous for taking the well-known "Migrant Mother" photograph
Walther Stampfli, 80, President of the Swiss Confederation in 1944 during World War II

October 12, 1965 (Tuesday)
The Vinland map, a map claiming to be created by 15th century Vikings which would indicate that the Vikings had visited North America centuries before the explorations of Christopher Columbus, was placed on public display at the Beinecke Rare Book and Manuscript Library at Yale University on the occasion of Columbus Day.  It was claimed that the map had been re-discovered in 1957, and was donated to Yale by alumnus Paul Mellon.  While considered a thrilling find at the time - "the most exciting cartographic discovery of the century" - later analysis showed that the map was produced after the 1920s and was a forgery.Yale Says Its Vinland Map, Once Called a Medieval Treasure, Is Fake.  September 30, 2021.
The U.N. General Assembly voted, 107 to 2, to call on the United Kingdom to "use force, if necessary" to prevent Rhodesia from making a threatened unilateral declaration of independence as a white minority ruled nation.  South Africa, which was ruled by its white minority, and Portugal, which still had colonies in Africa, were the only nations to vote against the resolution.

October 13, 1965 (Wednesday)
Congo's President Joseph Kasavubu fired Prime Minister Moise Tshombe and formed a provisional government, with Évariste Kimba as the acting premier.  Parliament, however, would not approve Kimba's government and on November 24, President Kasavubu and his government would be overthrown.  Tshombe, who had led the secession of Katanga province from the Congo, would go into exile and never return, while Kimba would be executed for treason less than eight months later.
Born:
 Aleksandra Konieczna, Polish film and stage actress, in Prudnik, Poland
 Kalpana Priyadarshini, Malayalam film actress billed as "Kalpana", in Chavara, Kerala state, India (d. 2016 of a heart attack)
Died: Paul Hermann Müller, 66, Swiss chemist and 1948 recipient of the Nobel Prize in Physiology or Medicine for his discovery of the properties of the insecticide DDT.

October 14, 1965 (Thursday)
Led by pitcher Sandy Koufax, the Los Angeles Dodgers defeated the Minnesota Twins, 2-0, in Game Seven of the best-4-of-7 1965 World Series to win the Major League Baseball championship. In the fifth inning, 37-year-old second baseman Jim Gilliam caught a left field hit by the Twins' Zoilo Versalles that might have driven in two runs. The Dodgers' two were scored by a home run from Lou Johnson in the fourth inning. The game ended when, with one man on base, Koufax struck out Minnesota's Bob Allison, who had hit 23 home runs that year.
Gemini Agena target vehicle 5003 was transferred to Vehicle Systems Test after completing final assembly on October 9. Testing began October 18.
The two would fly the supersonic bomber at Mach 3 for 30 minutes on May 19, 1966.
The Polaris A-1 submarine-launched ballistic nuclear missile (SLBM) was taken out of service by the U.S. Navy after a little more than five years of deployment on submarines worldwide, and replaced in all ballistic subs with the Polaris A-2.
Born:
Steve Coogan, British comedian and actor, in Middleton, Greater Manchester
Constantine Koukias, Australian opera composer
Died: 
Randall Jarrell, 51, American poet, was killed when he was struck by a car.
William Wilson, 90, British physicist

October 15, 1965 (Friday)
The Vatican ecumenical council of bishops voted, 1,763 to 250, to accept a declaration stating that the Jewish race could not be blamed for the crucifixion of Jesus Christ.  "On the Church's Attitude Toward Non-Christians" was approved for promulgation by Pope Paul VI as a decree that would be binding upon all members of the Roman Catholic Church worldwide.  The document also spoke out against any attempts to describe Jewish people as "rejected" or "accursed" by God.  An AP report commented that "Probably no document had aroused so much controversy at the 4-year-old council.  Never before has any general council in 20 centuries of Catholicism taken such positive stands on the Jewish and other non-Christian religions.
An order by the Federal Communications Commission (FCC) took effect, changing the nature and popularity of FM radio station broadcasting in the United States.  Prior to the adoption of the rule, which was first proposed on July 1, 1964, AM radio stations that had an FM radio transmitter would use the FM band as an adjunct to simulcast the AM radio programs.  "Obviously," the Commission would write in 1965, "it is a waste of valuable spectrum space to use two frequencies to bring the same material to the same location. This has been permitted in the past because it provided an easy and inexpensive start for FM broadcast."  Under the new rule, no FM station serving any city of 100,000 or more people was allowed no use more than half of its air time for the rebroadcasting of AM station programming."  A radio historian, Denny Sanders, would later note that because of the FCC rule, AM station owners used their less popular FM stations for alternative formats (such as album-oriented rock) aimed at "baby boomers", stereo recordings could be broadcast on FM and not on AM and the sound quality on FM was better.
Mikhail Sholokhov of the Soviet Union, best known as the author of the novel Tikhy Don (published in English as And Quiet Flows the Don) was announced as the recipient of the 1965 Nobel Prize for Literature.
Guitarist Jimi Hendrix signed a three-year recording contract with Ed Chaplin, receiving $1 and 1% royalty on records with Curtis Knight.  The agreement would later cause continuous litigation problems for Hendrix with other record labels.
Died: Abraham Fraenkel, 74, German-born Israeli mathematician best-known for the Zermelo–Fraenkel set theory

October 16, 1965 (Saturday)
Police found a girl's body on Saddleworth Moor near Oldham in Lancashire, which was quickly identified as that of 10-year-old Lesley Ann Downey, who had disappeared on December 26, from a fairground in the Ancoats area of Manchester. Ian Brady, who had been arrested a week earlier for murdering a 17-year-old boy, was charged along with his girlfriend Myra Hindley for Lesley's murder.
On the penultimate day of the New York World's Fair, a time capsule was lowered  into the ground, containing 117,000 pages of microfilmed records from 1940 to 1965, as well as 45 other objects. Among the objects included were "credit cards, a bikini, contact lenses, birth control pills, tranquilizers, a plastic heart valve, a pack of filter cigarettes, an electric toothbrush, and a heat shield from Apollo 7", as well as photographs of Andrew Wyeth paintings, a Henry Moore sculpture, microfilms of a book by Ernest Hemingway, poetry by Dylan Thomas and Robert Frost, a tape of a Danny Kaye television show, records by the Beatles, Joan Baez, and Thelonious Monk, and photographs of celebrities from the 1940s, 1950s, and 1960s. 
Anti-war protests drew 100,000 in 40 cities in the U.S. and around the world.
At Longshoreman's Hall in San Francisco, "A Tribute to Dr. Strange", described as "the first psychedelic rock concert", was performed, with the groups Jefferson Airplane, The Marbles, and The Great Society performing.

October 17, 1965 (Sunday)
The first successful American attack on a North Vietnamese surface-to-air missile (SAM) site was accomplished when four A-4 Skyhawk attack bombers struck a site near the Kép airfield northeast of Hanoi.
The New York World's Fair at Flushing Meadows, New York, observed its last day.  Rides remained open until 2:00 in the morning on Monday.  During its 1964 and 1965 runs, it attracted more than 50,000,000 admissions.  At the same time, the fair had a deficit of over $35,000,000.  As a result of its financial losses, some of the projected site park improvements had failed to materialize.
An Avianca Airlines DC-3 plane with 12 passengers and a crew of three was arriving at Bucaramanga, Colombia, in a flight from Bogotá.  As it was approaching, a 21-year old pilot, who had been awarded his license only two months earlier, was taking off from the same airport in a Piper Super Cub and collided with the DC-3.  Both airplanes came down in the residential neighborhoods of Las Terrazas and El Jardin.
Seven coal miners at Clinchfield Coal Company's Mars No. 2 mine were killed in a fire.
Born: Aravinda de Silva, Sri Lankan cricketer batsman; in Colombo, Ceylon (now Sri Lanka)
Died: 
Enrico Piaggio, 60, Italian industrialist who created the Vespa scooter
Bart King, 91, American cricket bowler and batsman who starred for the touring Gentlemen of Philadelphia between 1893 and 1912
Harold Kite, 43, American race car driver on the NASCAR circuit, was killed in a five-car pileup on the first lap of the National 400 race at the Charlotte Motor Speedway in Concord, North Carolina.

October 18, 1965 (Monday)
David J. Miller of Syracuse, New York, a 22-year-old man protesting the Vietnam War, became the first person to be arrested under the new federal law that made defacement of a selective service information card punishable as a crime.  Miller, who described himself as "a Catholic pacifist", was photographed burning his draft card on October 15 during an anti-war rally in New York City by the Catholic Worker Movement.  Miller was located by the FBI in Hooksett, New Hampshire, asked to produce his draft card, and charged when he failed to produce it.
With secret approval given by President Johnson on September 21, American troops took the Vietnam War into neighboring Laos as part of  Operation Shining Brass, losing six men.
Born: 
Zakir Naik, Sunni Muslim televangelist in India and founder of Peace TV, in Mumbai
Curtis Stigers, American jazz vocalist and saxophonist, in Boise, Idaho
Died: Henry Travers, 91, English-born character actor on film and stage who specialized in portraying "slightly bumbling but friendly and lovable old men", most notably as Clarence the angel in It's a Wonderful Life, and Mr. Ballard in Mrs. Miniver

October 19, 1965 (Tuesday)
Die Ermittlung (The Investigation), a play by Peter Weiss about the   Frankfurt Auschwitz trials, premiered simultaneously in 14 cities in both West Germany and East Germany, as well as in London.  Subtitled "Oratorio in 11 Cantos", Weiss's drama was seen that evening in East Berlin and West Berlin, as well as the West German cities of Cologne, Essen, and Munich, and the East German cities of  Cottbus, Dresden, Gera, Leuna, London, Meiningen, Neustrelitz, Potsdam, and Weimar.
The Siege of Plei Me began when 6,000 Viet Cong and 33rd North Vietnamese Army Regiment troops attacked the Plei Me fort near Pleiku in South Vietnam, in "one of the largest Communist offensives of the Vietnam War.  The 400 South Vietnamese Rangers and twelve U.S. Army Special Forces officers were supplemented by 200 additional Rangers who were brought in by helicopter the next day, and the group of 662 men held out until the U.S. 1st Cavalry Division were able to lift the siege on October 27.
The House Un-American Activities Committee (HUAC) opened public hearings in the first Congressional investigation of the American Ku Klux Klan white supremacist organizations.  Over the next four months, it would subpoena almost 200 members of various Klan organizations, starting with Robert Shelton, the Imperial Wizard of the United Klans of America.
Léopold Biha, who had been appointed as the new Prime Minister of Burundi less than three weeks earlier, was seriously wounded in an assassination attempt during a coup attempt by Hutu members of the Burundi military against the Tutsi government.  Biha would be hospitalized in Europe and would not be able to return to his duties until April.

October 20, 1965 (Wednesday)
Ludwig Erhard was re-elected Chancellor of Germany, by a vote of 272 to 200 in the Bundestag, by the 245 members of his own Christian Democratic Union party and another 27 votes from the Free Democrats, who received four of the 23 cabinet posts in the coalition government. The other candidate was future Chancellor Willy Brandt, leader of the Social Democrats. He had first been elected in 1963.
President Johnson signed the Motor Vehicle Air Pollution Control Act into law, permitting the first federal standards for vehicle exhaust. Under the rules, which were effective starting with the 1968 model year cars and trucks, carbon monoxide had to be reduced by more than half of the 1963 levels in the Clean Air Act of 1963 and hydrocarbons by nearly three-fourths. The House of Representatives had passed the bill on September 24 by a margin of 294 to 4, with the only opposition coming from future U.S. Senator Bob Dole of Kansas, Paul Findley of Illinois, and Graham Purcell and William R. Poage of Texas. Johnson signed the Solid Waste Disposal Act of 1965 into law on the same day, with the objective of "conservation of natural resources by reducing the amount of waste and unsalvageable materials" in manufacturing, packaging and marketing of consumer products, and to eliminate methods of trash disposal that resulted in scenic blights, public health hazards and accident hazards.
Systems testing at complex 14 of the Gemini Atlas-Agena target vehicle for Gemini VI was completed with a launch readiness demonstration. Final vehicle closeout and launch preparations began October 21 and continued until final countdown on October 25.
Manned Spacecraft Center (MSC) and Marshall Space Flight Center (MSFC) program officials and engineers held their first coordination meeting on the S-IVB Orbital Workshop and related Apollo Applications Program experiment activities. Among the most significant results of this meeting was a request by Houston for inclusion of an artificial gravity experiment as part of the S-IVB command and service module concept of the Workshop. MSFC officials undertook to define the feasibility of such an experiment, examining several possible technical approaches (including cables, a concept that MSC found less than appealing). MSFC investigators also sought help from Langley Research Center (LaRC), where considerable work along this line had been done as part of that Center's Manned Orbital Research Laboratory (MORL) study program.
Born:
 Stefano Pioli, Italian former association football player and current coach; in Parma
 Mikhail Shtalenkov, Russian ice hockey goaltender and Olympic gold medalist; in Moscow

October 21, 1965 (Thursday)
Comet Ikeya-Seki approached perihelion, passing  from the sun, and was bright enough to be seen in daylight from the Earth.
The Nobel Prize winners for 1965 were announced at Stockholm, with the Nobel Prize in Chemistry going to Robert Burns Woodward for the synthesis of chlorophyll, quinine, cholesterol, cortisone, reserpine, and strychnine during his career. The Nobel Prize in Physics was awarded jointly to Richard P. Feynman, Julian Schwinger, and Shin'ichirō Tomonaga, for their "fundamental work in quantum electrodynamics with deep-ploughing consequences for the physics of elementary particles".
British police found the decomposed body of a boy on Saddleworth Moor. It was later confirmed as that of John Kilbride, killed by the Moors murderers nearly two years earlier.
The U.S. Senate approved the Canada-United States Automotive Agreement, signed on January 16 by President Johnson and Prime Minister Pearson.
The U.S. Congress completed passage of the appropriations bills to fund the Great Society programs passed during the Johnson Administration, with a final bill to allocate $4,741,644,602 to cover the initial costs of Medicare, highway beautification, minting new coins without silver, expanding aid to education, and funding a variety of public welfare programs. The new amount raised the final 1965 total for money appropriated for the Great Society to the largest peacetime expenditure in American history up to that time, totaling $119.3 billion.
MSC Deputy Director George M. Low advised NASA Headquarters of Houston's planning schedule for follow-up procurement of Apollo spacecraft for the AAP. Based upon the most recent delivery schedules for the last several command and service modules and lunar excursion modules for Apollo, contract award for those vehicles was scheduled for July and August 1966. In accordance with a July 14 directive from Headquarters, MSC was preparing a procurement plan for the extended CSM and the LEM derivatives covering both the final definition and development and operational phases of AAP. Approval of this plan by Headquarters, Low stated, was anticipated for mid-December 1965, while award of contracts for the program definition phase was set for late January 1966. The contract award date for actual development of the extended CSM was slated for October 1966, while that for the LEM derivatives was postponed until mid-1967 (in line with revised funding directives from Washington).
George Roeder of Monroeville, Ohio, shattered the record for fastest speed on a motorcycle, traveling 176.824 miles per hour (or 284.57 km/h) at the Bonneville Salt Flats on a shielded Harley-Davidson 250 cc Sprint cycle. He covered the measured mile long course in 20.36 seconds. The previous record had been .
Dick Tiger of Nigeria reclaimed his title of boxing's World Middleweight Champion from Joey Giardello, who had dethroned him on December 7, 1963. Tiger (real name Richard Ihetu) won in a unanimous decision after the two had gone the full 15 rounds.
Died:
Bill Black, 39, rock and roll pioneer and inductee of the Rock & Roll Hall of Fame; of a brain tumor
Marie McDonald, 42, American actress and singer known as "The Body" because of her shapely physique; of a drug overdose at her home.

October 22, 1965 (Friday)
Members of the Organization of African Unity (OAU) voted to demand that the United Kingdom use force to prevent Rhodesia from declaring unilateral independence.
French authors André Figueras and Jacques Laurent were fined for their comments against France's President, Charles De Gaulle.
Cuba's Premier Fidel Castro issued what he referred to as a "clarification" of his September decree allowing free departure from the island nation for any Cubans who wished to leave. Castro said that young men between the ages of 17 and 26 would not be allowed to leave while they were eligible to be drafted into military service, and that professionals like physicians, dentists, nurses, engineering school graduates, and certain technical specialists were required to stay.
President Johnson signed the Highway Beautification Act into law, marking the end of a successful lobbying campaign by his wife, Lady Bird Johnson. An author would later note of Mrs. Johnson, "She had exercised the implicit power of the First Lady to push serious legislation through Congress. At no other time would enactment of billboard regulation even have been possible. In that sense, Mrs. Johnson's success represented a unique achievement in the historical evolution of the institution of First Lady." The U.S. Department of Commerce was authorized to withhold 20% of highway funding for any states that failed to set higher standards to regulate outdoor advertising.
McDonnell completed Systems Assurance Tests of Gemini spacecraft No. 8 and validation of the spacecraft environmental control system. The spacecraft simulated flight was conducted October 26-November 4.
Died:
Private First Class Milton Lee Olive III, 18, the first African-American to be awarded the Medal of Honor for service in the Vietnam War. Private Olive dived onto a live hand grenade and shielded four other members of his platoon from the blast. On April 28, 1966, he would be awarded the medal posthumously.
Paul Tillich, 79, German-born American theologian

October 23, 1965 (Saturday)
Dr. William Rashkind announced the success of his new surgical procedure, atrial balloon septostomy on newborn infants born with a cyanotic heart defect caused by transposition of the great arteries, speaking at a meeting of the cardiology section of the American Academy of Pediatrics in Chicago.  As one observer would note on the 25th anniversary of the surgery, Rashkind's announcement "permanently altered the course of cardiology and opened the era of therapeutic interventional catheterization."
The Roman Catholic bishops representing France during the Ecumenical Council in Rome announced that they were reviving, with the consent of Pope Paul VI, the ordination of "a small number of priests to work full time in factories and yards after a suitable period of preparation", reviving the "Worker-Priest" program that had been abandoned in 1954.

October 24, 1965 (Sunday)
Leading Cuban troops in the Congo, Che Guevara was almost killed when he attempted to engage in battle with mercenary soldiers commanded by Mike Hoare. According to one member of Guevara's camp at Luluaburg Mountain, "Che was shooting standing up and some fellow Cubans, trying to protect him, told him to lay down. He became angry and said 'There is only one Comandante here!'" After Guevara gave the order to retreat, four of the Cuban soldiers did not hear the command and continued to fight, giving the rest of the group time to get away.

October 25, 1965 (Monday)
According to police, the thieves used mattresses to muffle the sound of the weapon during the early morning hours, and made off with $400,000 in loot.
The Soviet Ministry of Defense issued a decree formally directing that the OKB-1 L1 lunar rocket system replace the LK-1 design that had been designed by the rival OKB-52 construction unit. The objective of what would become the Soyuz 7K-L1 was to create a rocket to rival the power of the American Saturn V in order to win the race between the U.S. and the U.S.S.R. to place the first man on the Moon.
The launch of the Gemini VI crewed space mission, intended to attempt a linkup with an uncrewd orbiting docking target, was postponed after NASA ground control determined that the first rocket had exploded as it was breaking the bonds of gravity. The Atlas booster rocket, carrying Gemini Agena target vehicle (GATV) 5002, was launched from complex 14 at 10:00 a.m., EST, and Gemini 6, with astronauts Wally Schirra and Thomas P. Stafford, was scheduled to go up at 11:41. The target vehicle suffered what appeared to be a catastrophic failure shortly after separating from the Atlas launch vehicle. When the two vehicles separated at 10:05, all signals were normal. However, approximately 375 seconds after liftoff, vehicle telemetry was lost and attempts to reestablish contact failed. Six minutes after the Agena was launched, radar at Patrick Air Force Base tracked five pieces of the $10,000,000 equipment falling toward the Atlantic Ocean. The Gemini VI countdown was held and then canceled at 10:54 a.m., because the target vehicle had failed to achieve orbit. Schirra and Stafford finally climbed out of the Gemini VI vehicle at 11:10 when the destruction of the Agena was confirmed. In accordance with Air Force Space Systems Division (SSD) procedures and NASA management instructions - both of which specified investigation in the event of such a failure - Major General Ben I. Funk, SSD Commander, reconvened the Agena Flight Safety Review Board, and NASA established a GATV Review Board. NASA would follow up on the failed mission with an even more ambitious project, and on December 15, would successfully launch Schirra and Stafford to perform a linkup with a crewed orbiting target, the Gemini VII spacecraft.
Governor Haydon Burns of Florida confirmed the report broken five days earlier by Orlando Sentinel reporter Emily Bavar, and announced that Walt Disney Productions was the purchaser of 27,443 acres of land (43 square miles or 113 square kilometers) in Orange County, Florida, on which Walt Disney World would be built.
Died: Hans Knappertsbusch, 77, German symphony conductor

October 26, 1965 (Tuesday)
The Beatles became "the first pop stars to be invited into Buckingham Palace"  as they received their designation of MBE (Members of the Order of the British Empire) at the Great Throne Room.  As part of the occasion, a military marching band played the music for "Can't Buy Me Love"  
In a crime that shocked Americans, 16-year old Sylvia Likens was tortured and murdered by Mrs. Gertrude Baniszewski, the Baniszewski children, and some of the children's friends.<ref>"Likens, Sylvia", in Murders in the United States: Crimes, Killers and Victims of the Twentieth Century, by R. Barri Flowers and H. Loraine Flowers (McFarland, 2004) p206</ref>
Born: 
Aaron Kwok, Hong Kong singer and actor, in Hong Kong; 
Sakari Oramo, Finnish conductor and violinist, in Helsinki; 
Kelly Rowan, Canadian television actress, in Ottawa
Judge Jules, award-winning British dance music DJ, in London
Ken Rutherford, New Zealand cricketer and former national team captain, in Dunedin

October 27, 1965 (Wednesday)
British European Airways Flight 706 crashed while attempting to land in London in a thick fog. The Vanguard airliner had originated in Edinburgh at 11:17 p.m. the night before and had made two attempts to land. On its third try, it hit the runway at full power, skidded for a mile, and crashed into a workshop at 1:30 in the morning. All 36 people on board were killed.
Süleyman Demirel of the Justice Party formed a new government as Prime Minister of Turkey.
Brazilian president Humberto de Alencar Castelo Branco, backed by the nation's armed forces, issued "Institutional Act No. 2", a decree suspending all political parties, and giving him power to pass laws and to amend Brazil's constitution without approval from the nation's Congress.
NASA Associate Administrator Robert C. Seamans, Jr., informed George E. Mueller, Associate Administrator for Manned Space Flight, that the catastrophic anomaly of Gemini Agena target vehicle (GATV) 5002 on October 25 had been defined as a mission failure. Accordingly, Seamans asked Mueller to establish a GATV Review Board to investigate all aspects of the Agena failure, managerial as well as technical. Manned Spacecraft Center Director Robert R. Gilruth and Major General O. J. Ritland, Deputy Commander for Space, Air Force Systems Command, were designated co-chairmen of the review board. Primary responsibility for determining the cause of failure lay with Air Force Space Systems Division, which would make its findings available to the board.
Died: 
Peter La Farge, 34, American folk singer and songwriter, of a stroke
Guy Richardson, 44, British Olympic rower, in crash of British European Airways Flight 706
Ardeshir Darabshaw Shroff, 66, Indian economist, industrialist, and banker who co-authored the Bombay Plan for the economic development of post-independence India, founded the Investment Corporation of India, and served as the Chairman of the Bank of India and the New India Assurance Company Limited

October 28, 1965 (Thursday)
Viet Cong guerrillas used mortars to destroy 18 American helicopters and two jets, and to damage 27 other aircraft, in an attack on two different air bases in South Vietnam.
Pope Paul VI promulgated five important Ecumenical Council documents from the Vatican II conference:Nostra Aetate ("In our Time", subtitled "On the Relations of the Church to Non-Christian Religions")Perfectae Caritatis, "Up-to-date renewal of religious life" Gravissimum Educationis ("On Christian Education")Christus Dominus ("On the Pastoral Office of Bishops")Optatam Totius ("On the Training of Priests")
The Moel-y-Parc transmitting station, the tallest structure in North Wales, began transmissions of BBC 405-line TV in addition to ITV, obtaining its signal from an SHF link on the Great Orme which picked up the signal from Llanddona on Anglesey.
The White House announced that NASA would attempt to launch Gemini VI while Gemini VII was in orbit. The original Gemini VI mission had been canceled when its target vehicle failed catastrophically on October 25. In a memorandum to the President, NASA Administrator James E. Webb indicated the possibility that the Gemini VI spacecraft and launch vehicle could be reerected shortly after the launch of Gemini VII. Since much of the prelaunch checkout of Gemini VI would not need repeating, it could be launched in time to rendezvous with Gemini VII (a mission scheduled for 14 days) if launching Gemini VII did not excessively damage the launch pad. NASA officials, spurred by suggestions from Walter F. Burke and John F. Yardley of McDonnell, began discussing the possibility of a dual mission immediately after the failure October 25, drawing on some six months of discussion and preliminary planning by NASA, Air Force, Martin, and McDonnell personnel for a rapid crewed flight launch demonstration.
Gemini spacecraft No. 6 and the second stage of Gemini launch vehicle (GLV) 6 were deerected and removed from complex 19. GLV-6 stage I was deerected the next day. The GLV was placed in storage at the Satellite Checkout Building under guard, in an environment controlled for temperature and humidity. Bonded storage maintained the integrity of previously conducted tests to reduce testing that would have to be repeated. Spacecraft No. 6 was stored in the Pyrotechnics Installation Building at the Merritt Island Launch Area.
The major portion of 819 discrepancies remaining from the First Article Configuration Inspection (FACI) of Gemini Agena target vehicle 5001 in June 1965 were cleared; 128 that had not been applied against the acceptance document (DD-250) remained. All subsystem FACI discrepancies were also closed out during October.
On October 28 and 29, Saturn Apollo Applications officials reached an understanding on several program issues during discussion at MSFC:
MSFC's responsibility for payload integration included coordination of interleaving of CSM and LEM experiment requirements when both modules carried experiments on the same mission. (Assignment of missions and experiments to the respective Centers was to be made by the program office at Headquarters.)
The astronauts would use tethers during all extravehicular activities except where not feasible.
MSFC was to proceed with work on a procurement plan and a request for proposals for two or three phase C integration contractors, with the idea that one of the definition contractors would receive the final phase D development contract (though no firm commitment to this course was yet made); also, concurrently with the phase C definition effort, MSFC would conduct parallel inhouse studies to better evaluate the contractors' phase C work.
In St. Louis, Missouri, the -tall inverted catenary steel Gateway Arch was topped out, as Vice President Hubert Humphrey observed from a helicopter, and an opening ceremony, originally scheduled for October 17, was held. A time capsule, containing the signatures of 762,000 students and others, was welded into the keystone before the final piece was set in place.
Born: Francisco Domínguez Brito, Attorney General of the Dominican Republic (2006–2010), in Santiago de los Caballeros

October 29, 1965 (Friday)
As part of the Vela Uniform program, code-named Project Long Shot, an 80-kiloton atomic bomb was detonated at a depth of  underground at Amchitka Island, Alaska, within the Alaska Maritime National Wildlife Refuge. "The Long Shot test... was not only fully contained but also left the sea otters and other wildlife unscathed," an author would note later. Two more Alaskan nuclear tests would be made at the same underground site, with the one megaton "Milrow" bomb in 1969, and the five megaton "Cannikin" in 1971. The purpose of the Longshot test was to determine whether an underground nuclear explosion generated wave patterns that were distinguishable from those generated by earthquakes on the Soviet Union's Kamchatka Peninsula, and scientists determined that the nuclear tests provided symmetrical wave patterns that would be readily discernible from natural tremors.
Indonesia's crackdown on that nation's Communist Party, the Partai Komunis Indonesia (PKI), expanded as the Minister of Education, Brigadier General Syarif Thayeb, instructed universities to purge their ranks of any academic or administrative staff who were linked to the PKI.
King Mohammed Zahir Shah dismissed Mohammad Yusuf from his position as Prime Minister of Afghanistan. The following year, the King would appoint him as Ambassador to West Germany.
Mehdi Ben Barka, living in exile after formerly serving as the leader of the National Consultative Assembly of Morocco, was kidnapped and executed after having been sentenced to death in absentia. Ben Barka had been living in Geneva in Switzerland but was lured by an agent of Israel's intelligence service, the Mossad, to travel to Paris for a supposed meeting with film producer Georges Franju to appear in a documentary. Outside the Brasserie Lipp restaurant on Boulevard Saint-Germain, Ben-Barka was arrested by three French security officers, who then took him away in a car. Ben Barka was not seen in public again, and was turned over to Morocco's Minister of the Interior, Mohamed Oufkir, whose agents tortured and killed him the next day.
On October 29 and 30, Gemini launch vehicle (GLV) 7 was erected at complex 19, following the deerection of GLV-6. Power was applied to GLV-7 on October 31, and Subsystems Reverification Tests (SSRT) began immediately. SSRT ended November 9, and the Prespacecraft Mate Verification Test was performed November 10. This test now included dropping all umbilicals, eliminating the need for a Flight Configuration Mode Test (FCMT). No FCMT was performed on GLV-7 or any subsequent vehicle.
Born:
Christy Clark, Premier of British Columbia from 2011 to 2017; in Burnaby
Andrew Ettingshausen, Australian rugby player
Louis Alexander Waldman, American art historian and professor
Died:
Bill McKechnie, 79, American baseball manager and inductee of the Baseball Hall of Fame
Frank Wisner, 56, former Director of Plans for the Central Intelligence Agency

October 30, 1965 (Saturday)
British Prime Minister Harold Wilson who had traveled to Rhodesia to negotiate conditions for Rhodesia's independence with Rhodesian Prime Minister Ian Smith, ended his mission with a television speech announcing that the United Kingdom would not use force to prevent Smith's white government from declaring independence, but that the UK would impose sanctions, especially on the shipment of oil.  "Whether force should and could have been used has been the subject of intense academic debate," an author would note later, but Wilson's statement would be followed by Rhodesia's secession 12 days later, on November 11.   
Forty-seven people were killed and more than 200 injured by the explosion of fireworks at a crowded indoor market in Cartagena, Colombia.  The fireworks had been in a storage room, awaiting sale in advance of the city holidays set for November 11, and the blast happened at around 9:00 in the morning, when hundreds of people were shopping.
The White House announced that circulation of the first 230,000,000 of the new, "nonsilver" American quarters would be put into circulation during the coming week, but emphasized that the new coins "will be added to the circulation of the traditional 90 percent silver quarter", and that "Both the old and new quarters are to circulate together."  
In New York City, 25,000 people marched down Fifth Avenue in support of President Johnson and the Vietnam War.  Demonstrations of support took place in other locations in the United States as well.  The New York march was sponsored by the New York City Council, the American Legion and the Veterans of Foreign Wars."
Two U.S. Air Force Skyraider A-1 attack bombers mistakenly struck the South Vietnamese village of De Duc in Bình Định Province, near Bong Son, killing 48 civilians, mostly women and children, and injuring 48 more.
Near Da Nang, the United States Marines repelled an intense attack by Viet Cong forces, killing 56 guerrillas. A sketch of Marine positions was found on the dead body of a 13-year-old Vietnamese boy who sold drinks to the Marines the day before.
English model Jean Shrimpton wore a controversially short white shift dress to the Victoria Derby at Flemington Racecourse in Melbourne, Australia – a pivotal moment of the introduction of the miniskirt to women's fashion   
Died: 
Arthur M. Schlesinger, Sr., 77, American historian
Arthur Wrigley, 53, English cricket statistician and commentator for the BBC

October 31, 1965 (Sunday)
In Leipzig, East Germany, the "Beat Revolt"  (Leipziger Beatdemo) took place after East German government revoked the performing licenses of the 50 amateur bands that played rock music and issued new rules to restrict listening to Western music in public.  When Leipzig's most popular band, Butler, was ordered not to play further, two teenagers printed leaflets urging a protest march.  The Stasi began interrogating witnesses "thereby advertising the march even more"  and on a Sunday afternoon, more than 2,000 people gathered, either to protest or to watch.  The crowd was ordered to disperse, even though no banners were displayed nor noise made, and when they refused, the Stasi arrested 267 people, some of whom were sentenced to forced labor.  Despite, or because of the crackdown, an increasing number of young East Germans began listening to Western music and adopting Western styles of dress.  
The Rockingham Speedway was inaugurated in Rockingham, North Carolina, with the running of the first American 500, won by Curtis Turner, who averaged nearly 102 miles per hour to complete race in almost six minutes less than five hours.Deb Williams, Charlotte Motor Speedway History: From Granite to Gold (Arcadia Publishing, 2013) 
Twenty-people were injured in a chain-reaction crash or pile-up of almost 100 cars on the Santa Ana Freeway near Norwalk, California.  On the same fog shrouded morning, another 50 cars were involved in a pile up on the Harbor Freeway in South Los Angeles.
Born
Paul du Toit, South African painter and sculptor (d. 2014)
Blue Edwards, American basketball player
Denis Irwin, Irish footballer and journalist
Rob Rackstraw, English voice actor
Died: 
Jan Kowalewski, 73, Polish cryptologist, intelligence officer, engineer, journalist and military commander
Rita Johnson, 52, American stage, film and radio actress, of a cerebral hemorrhage 
Dan Burros, 28, anti-Semitic member of the American Nazi Party and a recruiter for the New York City branch of the United Klans of America, committed suicide after the New York Times'' broke the news that he had been born to Jewish parents and had been raised as a Jew.  Burros, who had received his bar mitzvah as an adolescent and had been a star pupil at a Hebrew School, went to the home of a friend, told him "I ain't got nothing to live for," and shot himself in the chest and in the head.

References

1965
1965-10
1965-10